Södra Klagshamn was a locality situated in Malmö Municipality, Skåne County, Sweden with 1,367 inhabitants in 2010. It has grown together with Bunkeflostrand locality by 2015.

References 

Populated places in Malmö Municipality
Populated places in Skåne County